The Lincoln School is located in Shawano, Wisconsin.

Description
The school houses classes for grades from kindergarten through 8th grade. It was built to replace a previous school that had been destroyed after a fire. The school's design was advanced for the time, featuring showers, a fireplace, manual training and domestic sciences rooms, and a dental office.

References

School buildings on the National Register of Historic Places in Wisconsin
National Register of Historic Places in Shawano County, Wisconsin
Public elementary schools in Wisconsin
Public middle schools in Wisconsin
Education in Shawano County, Wisconsin
Collegiate Gothic architecture in the United States
Brick buildings and structures
Limestone buildings in the United States
School buildings completed in 1925
1925 establishments in Wisconsin